Sisurcana llaviucana is a species of moth of the family Tortricidae. It is found in Ecuador (Azuay Province and Loja Province).

References

Moths described in 2007
Sisurcana
Moths of South America
Taxa named by Józef Razowski